Thor (from ) is a prominent god in Germanic paganism. In Norse mythology, he is a hammer-wielding god associated with lightning, thunder, storms, sacred groves and trees, strength, the protection of humankind, hallowing, and fertility.

Due to the nature of the Germanic corpus, narratives featuring Thor are only attested in Old Norse, where Thor appears throughout Norse mythology. Norse mythology, largely recorded in Iceland from traditional material stemming from Scandinavia, provides numerous tales featuring the god. Thor is the son of Odin and Jörð, by way of his father Odin, he has numerous brothers, including . Thor wields the hammer , wears the belt  and the iron gloves , and owns the staff . Thor's exploits, including his relentless slaughter of his foes and fierce battles with the monstrous serpent —and their foretold mutual deaths during the events of —are recorded throughout sources for Norse mythology.

Into the modern period, Thor continued to be acknowledged in rural folklore throughout Germanic-speaking Europe. Thor is frequently referred to in place names, the day of the week Thursday bears his name (modern English Thursday derives from Old English , 'Þunor's day'), and names stemming from the pagan period containing his own continue to be used today, particularly in Scandinavia. Thor has inspired numerous works of art and references to Thor appear in modern popular culture. Like other Germanic deities, veneration of Thor is revived in the modern period in Heathenry.

Name
They descend from the Proto-Germanic reconstructed theonym  ('Thunder'), which is identical to the name of the ancient Celtic god Taranus (by metathesis–switch of sounds–of an earlier , attested in the dative tanaro and the Gaulish river name Tanarus), and further related to the Latin epithet Tonans (attached to Jupiter), via the common Proto-Indo-European root for 'thunder' . According to scholar Peter Jackson, those theonyms may have emerged as the result of the fossilization of an original epithet (or epiclesis, i.e. invocational name) of the Proto-Indo-European thunder-god , since the Vedic weather-god Parjanya is also called  ('Thunderer').

The perfect match between the thunder-gods *Tonaros and *Þun(a)raz, which both go back to a common form *ton(a)ros ~ *tṇros, is notable in the context of early Celtic–Germanic linguistic contacts, especially when added to other inherited terms with thunder attributes, such as *Meldunjaz–*meldo- (from *meldh- 'lightning, hammer', i.e. ' weapon) and *Fergunja–*Fercunyā (from  'wooded mountains', i.e. *Perkwunos' realm).

The English weekday name Thursday comes from Old English Þunresdæg, meaning 'day of Þunor'. It is cognate with Old Norse Þórsdagr and with Old High German Donarestag. All of these terms derive from the Late Proto-Germanic weekday *Þonaresdag ('Day of '), a calque of Latin  ('Day of Jove'; cf. modern Italian , French , Spanish ). By employing a practice known as  during the Roman period, ancient Germanic peoples adopted the Latin weekly calendar and replaced the names of Roman gods with their own.

Beginning in the Viking Age, personal names containing the theonym  are recorded with great frequency, whereas no examples are known prior to this period. -based names may have flourished during the Viking Age as a defiant response to attempts at Christianization, similar to the wide scale Viking Age practice of wearing Thor's hammer pendants.

Historical attestations

Roman era

They regard it as a religious duty to offer to him, on fixed days, human as well as other sacrificial victims. Hercules and Mars they appease by animal offerings of the permitted kind" and adds that a portion of the  also venerate "Isis". In this instance, Tacitus refers to the god Odin as "Mercury", Thor as "Hercules", and the god  as "Mars", and the identity of the Isis of the Suebi has been debated. In Thor's case, the identification with the god Hercules is likely at least in part due to similarities between Thor's hammer and Hercules' club. In his Annals, Tacitus again refers to the veneration of "Hercules" by the Germanic peoples; he records a wood beyond the river Weser (in what is now northwestern Germany) as dedicated to him. A deity known as Hercules Magusanus was venerated in Germania Inferior; due to the Roman identification of Thor with Hercules, Rudolf Simek has suggested that Magusanus was originally an epithet attached to the Proto-Germanic deity *Þunraz.

Post-Roman era

The first recorded instance of the name of the god appears upon the Nordendorf fibulae, a piece of jewelry created during the Migration Period and found in Bavaria. The item bears an Elder Futhark inscribed with the name  (i.e. ), the southern Germanic form of Thor's name.

Around the second half of the 8th century, Old English texts mention , which likely refers to a Saxon version of the god. In relation,  is sometimes used in Old English texts to gloss Jupiter, the god may be referenced in the poem Solomon and Saturn, where the thunder strikes the devil with a "fiery axe", and the Old English expression  ("thunder ride") may refer to the god's thunderous, goat-led chariot.

According to a near-contemporary account, the Christian missionary Saint Boniface felled an oak tree dedicated to "Jove" in the 8th century, the Donar's Oak in the region of Hesse, Germany.

Gabriel Turville-Petre saw this as an invented origin for the placename demonstrating loss of memory that Thunor had been a god's name.

Viking age
Adam details that "Thor, they reckon, rules the sky; he governs thunder and lightning, winds and storms, fine weather and fertility" and that "Thor, with his mace, looks like Jupiter". Adam details that the people of  had appointed priests to each of the gods, and that the priests were to offer up sacrifices. In Thor's case, he continues, these sacrifices were done when plague or famine threatened. Earlier in the same work, Adam relays that in 1030 an English preacher, Wulfred, was lynched by assembled Germanic pagans for "profaning" a representation of Thor.

Two objects with runic inscriptions invoking Thor date from the 11th century, one from England and one from Sweden. The second, the Kvinneby amulet, invokes protection by both Thor and his hammer.

On four (or possibly five) runestones, an invocation to Thor appears that reads "May Thor hallow (these runes/this monument)!"

It is also seen on runestone DR 48. The design is believed to be a heathen response to Christian runestones, which often have a cross at the centre. One of the stones, Sö 86, shows a face or mask above the hammer. Anders Hultgård has argued that this is the face of Thor. Sune Lindqvist argued in the 1930s that the image stone Ardre VIII on  depicts two scenes from the story: Thor ripping the head of Hymir's ox and Thor and Hymir in the boat, but this has been disputed.

Image gallery

Post-Viking age
In the 12th century, more than a century after Norway was "officially" Christianized, Thor was still being invoked by the population, as evidenced by a stick bearing a runic message found among the Bryggen inscriptions in Bergen, Norway. On the stick, both Thor and Odin are called upon for help; Thor is asked to "receive" the reader, and Odin to "own" them.

Poetic Edda

In the poem , a dead  recounts the history of the universe and foretells the future to the disguised god Odin, including the death of Thor.
{|
|- style="vertical-align: top;"
|
Benjamin Thorpe translation:
Then comes the mighty son of Hlôdyn:
(Odin's son goes with the monster to fight);
Midgârd's Veor in his rage will slay the worm.
Nine feet will go Fiörgyn's son,
bowed by the serpent, who feared no foe.
All men will their homes forsake.
|
Henry Adams Bellows translation:
Hither there comes the son of Hlothyn,
The bright snake gapes to heaven above;
...
Against the serpent goes Othin's son.
In anger smites the warder of earth,—
Forth from their homes must all men flee;—
Nine paces fares the son of Fjorgyn,
And, slain by the serpent, fearless he sinks.
|
|}

There,  says, Thor sits as judge at the immense cosmological world tree, .

In , the god 's messenger, threatens the fair , with whom  is smitten, with numerous threats and curses, including that Thor, and Odin will be angry with her, and that she risks their "potent wrath".

The ferryman, shouting from the inlet, is immediately rude and obnoxious to Thor and refuses to ferry him. In the end, Thor ends up walking instead.

Thor is again the main character in the poem , where, after the gods have been hunting and have eaten their prey, they have an urge to drink. They "sh[ake] the twigs" and interpret what they say. The gods decide that they would find suitable cauldrons at 's home. Thor arrives at 's home and finds him to be cheerful, looks into his eyes, and tells him that he must prepare feasts for the gods. Annoyed,  tells Thor that the gods must first bring to him a suitable cauldron to brew ale in. The gods search but find no such cauldron anywhere. However,  tells Thor that he may have a solution; east of  lives , and he owns such a deep kettle.

So, after Thor secures his goats at 's home, Thor and  go to 's hall in search of a cauldron large enough to brew ale for them all. They arrive, and  sees his nine-hundred-headed grandmother and his gold-clad mother, the latter of which welcomes them with a horn. After —who is not happy to see Thor—comes in from the cold outdoors, 's mother helps them find a properly strong cauldron. Thor eats a big meal of two oxen (all the rest eat but one), and then goes to sleep. In the morning, he awakes and informs  that he wants to go fishing the following evening, and that he will catch plenty of food, but that he needs bait.  tells him to go get some bait from his pasture, which he expects should not be a problem for Thor. Thor goes out, finds 's best ox, and rips its head off.

Thor casts his line and the monstrous serpent  bites. Thor pulls the serpent on board, and violently slams him in the head with his hammer.  shrieks, and a noisy commotion is heard from underwater before another lacuna appears in the manuscript.

After the second lacuna,  is sitting in the boat, unhappy and totally silent, as they row back to shore. On shore,  suggests that Thor should help him carry a whale back to his farm. Thor picks both the boat and the whales up, and carries it all back to 's farm. Some distance from 's home, an army of many-headed beings led by  attacks the two, but are killed by the hammer of Thor. Although one of his goats is lame in the leg, the two manage to bring the cauldron back, have plenty of ale, and so, from then on, return to 's for more every winter.

In the poem , the half-god Loki angrily flites with the gods in the sea entity 's hall. Thor does not attend the event, however, as he is away in the east for unspecified purposes. The god 's servant  interjects, and says that, since all of the mountains are shaking, she thinks that Thor is on his way home.  adds that Thor will bring peace to the quarrel, to which Loki responds with insults.

Thor arrives and tells Loki to be silent, and threatens to rip Loki's head from his body with his hammer. Loki asks Thor why he is so angry, and comments that Thor will not be so daring to fight "the wolf" when it eats Odin (a reference to the foretold events of ). Thor again tells him to be silent, and threatens to throw him into the sky, where he will never be seen again. Thor again tells him to be silent, threatening to break every bone in Loki's body. At Thor's final threat, Loki gives in, commenting that only for Thor will he leave the hall, for "I know alone that you do strike", and the poem continues.

In the comedic poem , Thor again plays a central role. In the poem, Thor wakes and finds that his powerful hammer, is missing. Thor turns to Loki, and tells him that nobody knows that the hammer has been stolen. The two go to the dwelling of the goddess , and so that he may attempt to find , Thor asks her if he may borrow her feather cloak.  agrees, and says she would lend it to Thor even if it were made of silver or gold, and Loki flies off, the feather cloak whistling.

Loki responds that he has bad news for both the elves and the —that Thor's hammer, is gone.  says that he has hidden  eight leagues beneath the earth, from which it will be retrieved, but only if  is brought to him as his wife.

Thor asks Loki if his efforts were successful, and that Loki should tell him while he is still in the air as "tales often escape a sitting man, and the man lying down often barks out lies."

As a result, the gods and goddesses meet and hold a thing to discuss and debate the matter. Thor rejects the idea, yet Loki interjects that this will be the only way to get back . Loki points out that, without , the  will be able to invade and settle in Asgard. The gods dress Thor as a bride, and Loki states that he will go with Thor as his maid, and that the two shall drive to  together.

Terrifying eyes stare back at him, seemingly burning with fire. Loki says that this is because "" has not slept for eight nights in her eagerness.

The "wretched sister" of the  appears, asks for a bridal gift from "", and the  bring out  to "sanctify the bride", to lay it on her lap, and marry the two by "the hand" of the goddess .

In the poem , Thor tricks a dwarf, to his doom upon finding that he seeks to wed his daughter (unnamed, possibly ). As the poem starts, Thor meets a dwarf who talks about getting married. Thor finds the dwarf repulsive and, apparently, realizes that the bride is his daughter. Thor comments that the wedding agreement was made among the gods while Thor was gone, and that the dwarf must seek his consent. To do so, Thor says,  must tell him what he wants to know about all of the worlds that the dwarf has visited. In a long question and answer session,  does exactly that; he describes natural features as they are known in the languages of various races of beings in the world, and gives an amount of cosmological lore.

However, the question and answer session turns out to be a ploy by Thor, as, although Thor comments that he has truly never seen anyone with more wisdom in their breast, Thor has managed to delay the dwarf enough for the Sun to turn him to stone; "day dawns on you now, dwarf, now sun shines on the hall".

Prose Edda, and sagas
Thor is further said here to have been raised in Thrace by a chieftain named Lorikus, whom he later slew to assume the title of "King of Thrace", to have had a pale complexion and hair "fairer than gold", and to have been strong enough to lift ten bearskins. In later sagas he is described as red-bearded, but there is no evidence for a red beard in the Eddas.

Odin is a remote descendant of Thor, removed by twelve generations, who led an expedition across Germany, Denmark and Sweden to Norway.

The saga narrative adds that numerous names—at the time of the narrative, popularly in use—were derived from Thor.

Saint Olaf

Around the 12th century, folk traditions and iconography of the Christianizing king Olaf II of Norway (Saint Olaf; c. 995 – 1030) absorbed elements of both Thor and Freyr. After Olaf's death, his cult had spread quickly all over Scandinavia, where many churches were dedicated to him, as well as to other parts of Northern Europe. His cult distinctively mixed both ecclesiastical and folk elements. From Thor, he inherited the quick temper, physical strength and merits as a giant-slayer. Early depictions portray Olaf as clean-shaven, but after 1200 he appears with a red beard. For centuries, Olaf figured in folk traditions as a slayer of trolls and giants, and as a protector against malicious forces.

Modern folklore
Tales about Thor, or influenced by native traditions regarding Thor, continued into the modern period, particularly in Scandinavia. Writing in the 19th century, scholar Jacob Grimm records various phrases surviving into Germanic languages that refer to the god, such as the Norwegian  ("Thor's warmth") for lightning and the Swedish  ("The good old (fellow) is taking a ride") as well as the word  ("Thor's rumble" or "Thor's thunder") when it thunders. Grimm comments that, at times, Scandinavians often "no longer liked to utter the god's real name, or they wished to extol his fatherly goodness". In Sweden, it was probably as a euphemism that people referred to thunder as "the ride of the god" – *ās-ækia (OWN: *áss-ekja) resulting in the modern Swedish word for thunder – åska.

A Scandinavian folk belief that lightning frightens away trolls and  appears in numerous Scandinavian folktales, and may be a late reflection of Thor's role in fighting such beings. In connection, the lack of trolls and ettins in modern Scandinavia is explained as a result of the "accuracy and efficiency of the lightning strokes".

In the Netherlands, The Sagas of Veluwe has a story called Ontstaan van het Uddeler- en Bleeke meer which features Thor and that he fights giants.

Archaeological record

Hammer pendants, hammer coins, and Eyrarland Statue

Around 1000 pendants in distinctive shapes representing the hammer of Thor have been unearthed in what are today the Nordic countries, England, northern Germany, the Baltic countries, and Russia. Most have very simple designs in iron or silver. Around 100 have more advanced designs with ornaments. The pendants have been found in a variety of contexts (including at urban sites, and in hoards) and occur in a variety of shapes. Similarly, coins featuring depictions of the hammer have also been discovered.

The Eyrarland Statue, a copper alloy figure found near , Iceland dating from around the 11th century, may depict Thor seated and gripping his hammer.

Swastikas

The swastika symbol has been identified as representing the hammer or lightning of Thor. Scholar Hilda Ellis Davidson (1965) comments on the usage of the swastika as a symbol of Thor:
The protective sign of the hammer was worn by women, as we know from the fact that it has been found in women's graves. It seems to have been used by the warrior also, in the form of the swastika. ... Primarily it appears to have had connections with light and fire, and to have been linked with the sun-wheel. It may have been on account of Thor's association with lightning that this sign was used as an alternative to the hammer, for it is found on memorial stones in Scandinavia besides inscriptions to Thor. When we find it on the pommel of a warrior's sword and on his sword-belt, the assumption is that the warrior was placing himself under the Thunder God's protection.

Eponymy and toponymy

Numerous place names in Scandinavia contain the Old Norse name . The place name  is recorded with particular frequency in Denmark (and has direct cognates in Norse settlements in Ireland, such as ), whereas  appears particularly often in southern Norway. (Thor's Island) appears on the Swedish west coast. Thor also appears in many place names in Uppland.

In English place names, Old English  (in contrast with the Old Norse form of the name, later introduced to the Danelaw) left comparatively few traces. Examples include Thundersley, from * and Thurstable (Old English "Thunor's pillar"). F. M. Stenton noted that such place names were apparently restricted to Saxon and Jutish territory and not found in Anglian areas.

In what is now Germany, locations named after Thor are sparsely recorded, but a number of locations called  (German "Donner's mountain") may derive their name from the deity , the southern Germanic form of the god's name.
In Sweden in the 19th century, smooth, wedge-shaped stones found in the earth were called  ("Thor's wedges"), according to a folk belief that they were once hurled at a troll by the god Thor. (Compare Thunderstones.) Similarly, meteorites may be considered memorials to Thor in folk tradition due to their sheer weight. When the beetle is found turned upside down and one flips it over, Thor's favor may be gained.

In the northwest of Spain, there is a river called Torío in the municipality of Cármenes (León) that take name from the god Thor.

Origin, theories, and interpretations
Although in the past it was suggested that Thor was an indigenous sky god or a Viking Age import into Scandinavia, these Indo-European parallels make him generally accepted today as ultimately derived from a Proto-Indo-European deity.

In 's trifunctional hypothesis of Indo-European religion, Thor represents the second function, that of strength.  notes that as a result of displacements, he does not lead armies; most of the functions of Indra have been in effect taken over by Odin. Many scholars have noted the association of Thor with fertility, particularly in later folklore and in the reflex of him represented by the Sami  ("Good-man Thor"). For , this is the preservation by peasants of only the side-effect of the god's atmospheric battles: the fertilizing rain. Others have emphasized Thor's close connection to humanity, in all its concerns. Scholar Hilda Ellis Davidson summarizes:
The cult of Thor was linked with men's habitation and possessions, and with the well-being of the family and community. This included the fruitfulness of the fields, and Thor, although pictured primarily as a storm god in the myths, was also concerned with the fertility and preservation of the seasonal round. In our own times, little stone axes from the distant past have been used as fertility symbols and placed by the farmer in the holes made by the drill to receive the first seed of spring. In this way Thor, as well as Odin, may be seen to continue the cult of the sky god which was known in the Bronze Age.

Modern influence

In modern times, Thor continues to be referred to in art and fiction. In English he features for example in Henry Wadsworth Longfellow's "The Challenge of Thor" (1863) and in two works by Rudyard Kipling: Letters of Travel: 1892–1913 and "Cold Iron" in Rewards and Fairies. L. Sprague de Camp's Harold Shea met with Thor, as with other Norse gods, in the first of Shea's many fantasy adventures.

In the fields of science and technology, Swedish chemist  (1779–1848) discovered a chemical element that he named after Thor – thorium. Thor is also the namesake of the PGM-17 Thor missile.

In 1962, American comic book artist Jack Kirby, Marvel Comics editor Stan Lee and his brother Larry Lieber created a feature in the comic book Journey Into Mystery a series featuring Thor as a superhero. This version of Thor is portrayed as a clean-shaven blonde, instead of red-haired and bearded. The magazine soon added the backup feature "Tales of Asgard" in which Kirby illustrated stories from Norse mythology; eventually, the magazine was retitled Thor. Lee and Kirby included Thor as a founding member of their superhero team the Avengers. Thor has been portrayed in the Marvel Cinematic Universe by Australian actor Chris Hemsworth, appearing in Thor, The Avengers, Thor: The Dark World, Avengers: Age of Ultron, Doctor Strange, Team Thor, Thor: Ragnarok, Avengers: Infinity War, Avengers: Endgame and Thor: Love and Thunder. Thor has also been featured in comic books by other publishers. In the Savage Dragon comics, Thor is portrayed as a villain. In Neil Gaiman's Sandman comic, Thor is portrayed as a buffoon who wields a tiny toffee hammer.

First described in 2013, Thor's hero shrew (Scutisorex thori) is a species of shrew native to the Democratic Republic of Congo. It and its sister species, the hero shrew (Scutisorex somereni), are the only mammal species known to have interlocking vertebrae. The team named the shrew after Thor due to the god's association with strength.

From 2015 to 2017, a fictionalised version of Thor was a supporting character in Magnus Chase and the Gods of Asgard, a trilogy of fantasy novels written by American author Rick Riordan and published by Disney-Hyperion, set in the same fictional universe as the Camp Half-Blood Chronicles, and The Kane Chronicles series by the same author. Neil Gaiman's books American Gods and Norse Mythology also feature Thor.

In January 2020, the streaming service Netflix produced Ragnarok. In the show, a high school student, Magne Seier, receives Thor's powers and abilities to fight the giants that are polluting Norway and murdering people. Netflix released the second season on 27 May 2021. Thor/Magne is portrayed by David Stakston.

Thor is also featured in a number of video games. In the 2002 Ensemble Studios game Age of Mythology, Thor is one of three major gods Norse players can worship. In Santa Monica Studio's 2018 video game God of War, Thor is mentioned throughout and his sons Magni and Modi are secondary antagonists. Thor makes an appearance at the end of the main storyline if certain difficulty conditions are met by the player. He makes a much more substantial appearance in the game's 2022 sequel God of War Ragnarök as a primary antagonist, played by Ryan Hurst. Thor is also mentioned in Ubisoft's 2020 game Assassin's Creed Valhalla, where items of his such as Mjölnir can be found and used by the player in combat. Thor is also one of the playable gods in the third-person multiplayer online battle arena game Smite.

See also
List of Germanic deities
Hercules Magusanus
Zeus
Indra
Perun
Axe of Perun

Notes

References

 
 
 
 
 Chrisholm, Hugh (Editor) (1910) Encyclopædia Britannica, vol. 9. The Encyclopædia Britannica Co.
 
 
 
 
 
 
 
 
 

 
 
 
 
 

 
 
 
 
 
 
 
 
 
 
 
 
 De Vries, Jan (1957). Altgermanische Religionsgeschichte Volume 2. 2nd ed. (repr. 1970). Grundriß der germanischen Philologie, Volume 12/II. De Gruyter.

External links

Clicking on a thumbnail brings up the full image and information concerning it.

 
Æsir
Germanic gods
Heroes in Norse myths and legends
Sky and weather gods
Sons of Odin
Thunder gods
Jovian deities
Dragonslayers
Killed deities
Norse gods